QSI may refer to:

 IATA airport code for Moshi Airport
 Quality Schools International
 Quick Step-Innergetic
 Quality Standards Illustrated
 Qatar Sports Investment
 QSI Corporation
 Quorum Sensing Inhibitors